The European Journal of Clinical Nutrition is a monthly peer-reviewed medical journal covering nutrition science and published by the Springer Nature. It was established in 1947 by John Waterlow as Nutrition and renamed Journal of Human Nutrition in 1976. In 1982 its name was changed to Human Nutrition and the journal was split into two sections: Human Nutrition: Applied Nutrition and Human Nutrition: Clinical Nutrition. These two sections were combined again in 1988 with the journal obtaining its current name. The editor-in-chief is Mario J. Soares (Curtin University).

Abstracting and indexing
The journal is abstracted and indexed in:

According to the Journal Citation Reports,  European Journal of Clinical Nutrition has a 2020 impact factor of 4.016.

References

External links

Nutrition and dietetics journals
Nature Research academic journals
Monthly journals
English-language journals
Publications established in 1947